The Mhallami, Mahallami, or Mardelli is an Arabic-speaking tribal ethnic group traditionally living in and around the city of Mardin, Turkey. Due to migration since 1920 they have a large presence in Lebanon as well. As a result of the Lebanese Civil War, large numbers fled to Europe, particularly Germany. They typically identify themselves as Arabs, but are sometimes associated with other ethnic groups such as Kurds, Assyrians/Arameans. though their historical roots are not definitively established. They are Sunni-Muslims and primarily speakers of an Arabic dialect that has Turkish, Kurdish, and Aramaic influences.

Origin

Multiple claims regarding the origins of the group have been presented, that the group descends from the Assyrian/Aramean population of the Mardin region that converted to Islam and Arabized linguistically or that the group originates from the Arab Peninsula.

The date of their appearance in Anatolia is unknown, but likely sometime in the 5th century. There are no known written records by their ancestors of this period. Among the Mhallami there is a view that they are descended from Banu Hilal tribes, but historical sources and research indicate that this is somewhat unlikely. Arab ancestry is more probably from Rabi'ah tribes, possibly Banu Shayban, though this does not preclude Kurdish and/or Aramean roots. Some sources view the group as ethnically or denominationally Assyrian.

English traveller Mark Sykes wrote in 1907: This tribe has a peculiar history. They state that 350 years ago they were Christians. During a famine of corn they asked the Patriarch permission to eat meat during Lent. The Patriarch refused, and they became Moslems. They speak a bastard Arabic, and the women wear red clothes and do not veil. Ibrahim Pasha says they are now a mixed race of Arabs and Kurds. Some families are still supposed to be Christians.

This theory is also confirmed by orientalist Ishaq Armala and by the Syriac Orthodox patriarch Ignatius Aphrem I who indicated that the Syriac Christians who converted to Islam under pressure  started calling themselves Mhalmoye at the end of the 17th century.

Demographics

Mhallami of Turkey
In 2015, the founding chairman Mehmet Ali Aslan became the first Mhallami to be elected a member of the Turkish Parliament from the Kurdish HDP party. The migration of the Mhallami from Turkey to Lebanon began in the 1920s. In the 1940s, tens of thousands more came to Lebanon, mostly in the cities of Beirut and Tripoli. The last leader of the Mhallami in Turkey is lawyer Şeyhmus Miroğlu, member of beytil emir.

Mhallami of Lebanon
The Mhallami had traditionally settled in large numbers in Lebanese regions such as Tripoli, the Beqaa Valley and Beirut where they have become an integral part of the country's Sunni community after migrating from the Mardin Province in Turkey. Lebanon had a population between 70,000 and 100,000 Mhallami prior to Lebanese Civil War. Their origin and legal status became a particular concern when they started to seek asylum in Western European countries en masse in the early 1980s.

Mhallami of Europe
The Mhallami were among the Lebanese Civil War refugees from Lebanon who came to Germany and other European countries such as the Netherlands, Denmark and Sweden during the Lebanese civil war since 1976  and have since been partially tolerated or live as asylum seekers. With around 8,000 people, Berlin has the largest Mhallami diaspora community in Europe (as of June 2003).

See also
 Lebanese people in Germany
 Miri-Clan
 Al-Zein clan
 Ömerli, Mardin

References

 
Arab groups
Turkish Arab people
Ethnic groups in Turkey
Semitic-speaking peoples
Mardin Province